Heavens Edge are an American glam metal band from Philadelphia, active in the late 1980s and early 1990s. The band reunited with all original members in 2013, and has played occasional shows since then.

Biography
Heavens Edge formed in 1987 in Philadelphia and was founded by guitarist Reggie Wu and singer Mark Evans. The band went through several guitar player changes in its earlier days. Heaven's Edge released two albums: Heavens Edge (1990) for Columbia Records, that reached number 141 on The Billboard 200, and Some Other Place Some Other Time (1998) on MTM. Heavens Edge was produced by Neil Kernon. The band released a music video for their most popular single, "Skin To Skin". During recording of their second album, also with producer Neil Kernon, Heaven's Edge signed a new record deal with MTM Records in 1998 and were asked to record a new album. The album was originally scheduled to be released in 1992 but was not finished until 1998 when a couple of new songs were written and recorded. Their second album, Some Other Place, Some Other Time, included both the second album sessions with Neil Kernon and the new 1998 songs, and was released by MTM Music in Europe, Pony Canyon in Japan, and Perris Records in the United States. The US version had a different cover and six additional demo tracks as bonus. A year after the album's release, Heaven's Edge was asked to record a song for the Mötley Crüe Kickstart My Heart Tribute Album. The band recorded a cover of "Don't Go Away Mad (Just Go Away)".

One night while performing at the Empire Rock Club in Philadelphia, the bassist George "G.G." Guidotti was shot in the abdomen by a disgruntled bar patron, angry about being turned away by the club bouncer.

After the band split, some of the band members formed the band American Pie with a new singer. American Pie recorded three demos and played live but never released an official album.

In October 2013, a reunited Heaven's Edge played the Firefest festival in Nottingham, England, a sold-out show in Philadelphia at World Cafe, as well as the M3 Festival in Maryland and MelodicRock Fest in Chicago in 2014.

Guidotti died from lung cancer on August 18, 2019.

Current Members
Reggie Wu – Guitar, keyboards, piano, backing vocals
Mark Evans – Lead vocals, acoustic guitar, keyboards, piano
David "Dave" Rath – Drums
Steven "Steve" Parry – Guitar
Jaron Gulino – Bass guitar

Former Members
George "G.G." Guidotti – Bass guitar (died 2019)
Jimmy Marchiano – Guitar

Timeline

Discography

Studio albums

Singles

Demos
Heavens Edge (1989)

Other appearances

References

External links
 HeavensEdge.net

1987 establishments in Pennsylvania
Glam metal musical groups from Pennsylvania
Heavy metal musical groups from Pennsylvania
Musical groups from Philadelphia
Musical groups established in 1987